is a Japanese composer and arranger.

Biography 
Born on June 6, 1986, in Kitakyushu, Fukuoka, Japan. A self-taught pianist, he began composing music at age 11 and completed his first band composition at age 15.  In 2009, he earned a degree from the Toho College of Music where he was a student of Jun Nagao. His works have been performed in many countries and have been recorded on CDs by many bands in such countries as the United States, Japan, Germany, and Belgium.  Also in 2009, he received the 42nd Kitakyushu Cultural Award for his
compositions.

Compositions

Concert Band

Fanfare Band

Flex Band

String Orchestra

Ensembe

Arrangements

Concert Band

Flex Band

External links 
 Official website
Naoya Wada bio and list of works at C. L. Barnhouse Co. official website
Naoya Wada bio and list of works at TRN Music official website
Grand Mesa Music Publishers
Beriato Music
Molenaar Edition

1986 births
Japanese classical composers
Japanese male classical composers
Japanese music arrangers
Living people